List of Faking It episodes may refer to:

 List of Faking It (2000 TV series) episodes
 List of Faking It (2014 TV series) episodes